Şamil Tayyar (born 1 January 1965 in Gaziantep) is a Turkish journalist, author, and deputy for the Justice and Development Party (AKP) since 2011. He is a columnist with the daily Star and has contributed to Yeni Şafak, Milliyet and Sabah. He has published a book on the Ergenekon trials, Operation Ergenekon.

In December 2009 Tayyar was sentenced to 20 months' imprisonment for his book "Operation Ergenekon" (tr: Operasyon Ergenekon) on the grounds that he had violated the duty to observe secrecy of an investigation and tried to influence a fair trial. The sentence was suspended for five years.

Books
 Refahyol Tutanakları (Ümit Yayıncılık, Ankara, 1997)
 5n 1Kamyon (Birharf Yayınları, 2006)
 Operasyon Ergenekon (Timaş Yayınları, İstanbul, 2008)
 Gölge İktidar (Timaş Yayınları, İstanbul, 2008)
 Kıt'a Dur! (Timaş Yayınları, İstanbul, 2009)

References

External links 
 

1965 births
People from Gaziantep
Gazi University alumni
Living people
Deputies of Gaziantep
Justice and Development Party (Turkey) politicians
Turkish journalists
Members of the 25th Parliament of Turkey
Members of the 24th Parliament of Turkey
Members of the 26th Parliament of Turkey